Mirela Korač (born 1984) is a model who was the Slovenian competitor in the 2009 Miss Universe Pageant.

External links
Miss Universe profile of Korac

1984 births
Living people
Miss Universe 2009 contestants
Slovenian beauty pageant winners
Slovenian female models
Place of birth missing (living people)
Date of birth missing (living people)
21st-century Slovenian women